Henry Boyle, 3rd Earl of Shannon KP, PC (Ire) (8 August 1771 – 22 April 1842), styled Viscount Boyle from 1764 until 1807, was among the last surviving Members of the Parliament of Ireland. He represented Cork County in the new Parliament of the United Kingdom from 1801 to 1807. He then briefly served as Member of Parliament for Bandon in 1807, succeeding as Earl of Shannon later in the same year. He served as Custos rotulorum for County Cork from 1807 to his death. He was the first Lord Lieutenant of Cork from 1831 to his death.

Family

He was a son of Richard Boyle, 2nd Earl of Shannon, and Catherine Ponsonby. His sister Catherine Henrietta Boyle married Francis Bernard, 1st Earl of Bandon. Their maternal grandparents were John Ponsonby, Speaker of the Irish House of Commons from 1756 to 1771, and his wife Lady Elizabeth Cavendish. Lady Elizabeth was a daughter of William Cavendish, 3rd Duke of Devonshire, and his wife Catherine Hoskins. Her maternal grandparents were John Hoskins and Catherine Hale.

Career

Parliament of Ireland
Boyle was educated at Winchester College. He represented the borough of Clonakilty in the Irish Parliament from 1793 until 1797 and then Cork County from 1797 until the Act of Union in 1801. In 1798, he was also elected for Rathcormack, however, chose not to sit. According to his obituary in The Gentleman's Magazine, Boyle "took an active part in arming the yeomanry in Ireland." On 31 October 1796 Boyle was commissioned Captain of five different units, those of Castlemartyr, Cloyne, Cove, Imokilly and Middleton. At the time the Kingdom of Great Britain and the Kingdom of Ireland were under personal union. The Yeomanry were volunteer regiments raised in many counties from yeomen. Their purpose was to strengthen the defence of the two Kingdoms which faced the threat of an invasion by the French First Republic.

The Irish Rebellion of 1798 was assisted by a French invasion force under Jean Joseph Amable Humbert. The rebellion and the invasion failed. To secure control of Ireland, the Parliament of Ireland and the Parliament of Great Britain negotiated a merger of the two kingdoms. The Act of Union 1800 resulted in the formation of the United Kingdom of Great Britain and Ireland. The final passage of the Act in the Irish Parliament was achieved with substantial majorities, achieved in part, according to contemporary documents, through bribery, in the form of peerages and honours to critics to get their votes. Whereas the first attempt had been defeated in the Irish House of Commons by 109 votes against to 104 for, the second vote in 1800 produced a result of 158 to 115. By agreement, Ireland gained 100 seats in the British House of Commons and 32 seats in the House of Lords: 28 representative peers elected for life, and four clergymen of the (Anglican) Church of Ireland, chosen for each session.

Parliament of the United Kingdom
Boyle was among the new Members of the House of Commons, representing Cork County in the new Parliament of the United Kingdom from 1801 to 1807. There was no actual 1801 United Kingdom general election. All members of the House of Commons entered it by right of their previous election to seats in Great Britain or Ireland. Cork County also had a second representative in the person of Robert Uniacke Fitzgerald. They are both listed among the Members of the 1st UK Parliament from Ireland. Boyle and Fitzgerald run unopposed in the 1802 United Kingdom general election. They were both among the Members of the 2nd UK Parliament from Ireland.

On 6 August 1803, Boyle was commissioned captain of a sixth unit, that of Youghal. During the 1st and 2nd Parliaments Boyle was not listed as either a Tory or a Whig. However, he ran as a Whig in the 1806 United Kingdom general election. He was elected alongside George Ponsonby, a fellow Whig. Their faction was at the time under the leadership of Charles Grey, 2nd Earl Grey.

In the 1807 United Kingdom general election, Boyle changed his constituency. Ponsonby and James Bernard were elected in County Cork. On 15 May 1807, Boyle was elected Member of Parliament for Bandon He succeeded Courtenay Boyle in the position. Henry was listed as a Tory on this occasion. Possibly indicating support for the political coalition led by William Cavendish-Bentinck, 3rd Duke of Portland. On 18 May 1807, Boyle was also elected in Youghal as a Whig. He succeeded James Bernard.

On 20 May 1807, the 2nd Earl of Shannon died. Henry succeeded him in his titles and left the House of Commons. He served as Custos Rotulorum of County Cork from 1807 to his death. Shannon entered the Privy Council of Ireland in 1808. That same year he became a Knight of St. Patrick. He was the first Lord Lieutenant of Cork from 1831 to his death.

His death reportedly followed "an illness of nearly two years' duration".

Marriage and children

On 7 June 1798, Boyle married Sarah Hyde, daughter of John Hyde of Castle Hyde. Her mother was Sarah Burton. Their twelve children were listed by order of birth in his obituary:

Lady Catharine Boyle, listed as "unmarried" in 1842.
The Honourable Richard Boyle, "died an infant in 1803".
Lady Sarah Boyle, listed as "unmarried" in 1842.
Lady Harriet Boyle, listed "deceased" in 1842.
Lady Louisa Grace-Boyle, unmarried in 1842.
Richard Boyle, 4th Earl of Shannon (12 May 1809 – 1 August 1868).
Lady Jane Boyle, unmarried in 1842.
Lady Elizabeth Boyle, unmarried in 1842.
The Honourable Henry Charles Boyle, "Lieut. Royal Fusiliers". Married Catharine-Sophronia-Jane Ede in 1841.
Lady Charlotte-Anne Boyle, unmarried in 1842.
The Honourable Robert Francis Boyle, "born in 1818".
Lady Frances Boyle, "died in 1824, aged four years".

References

External links

Page of "Gentleman's Magazine" featuring his Obituary
 Introduction to Shannon Papers. PRONI

1771 births
1842 deaths
Irish MPs 1790–1797
Irish MPs 1798–1800
Knights of St Patrick
Lord-Lieutenants of Cork
Members of the Parliament of Ireland (pre-1801) for County Cork constituencies
Members of the Privy Council of Ireland
Members of the Parliament of the United Kingdom for County Cork constituencies (1801–1922)
UK MPs 1801–1802
UK MPs 1802–1806
UK MPs 1806–1807
UK MPs who inherited peerages
Whig (British political party) MPs for Irish constituencies
Henry
Earls of Shannon